Williamstown railway station is the terminus of the electrified suburban Williamstown line in Victoria, Australia. It serves the western Melbourne suburb of Williamstown, and it opened on 17 January 1859.

The station building is listed on the Victorian Heritage Register, and is the second oldest railway station in Victoria, after St Kilda. It is also the oldest timber railway station building to survive in the state, and one of the earliest surviving timber public buildings in Victoria.

At the Up end of the station platform, the double track railway converges into single track.

History

Work on the line started under the Melbourne, Mount Alexander and Murray River Railway Company, but were taken over by the government in 1856, after work faltered. Builders Kerr, Hodgson & Billings commenced work on the timber station building in 1858, with the station opening to traffic on 17 January 1859. Arched bluestone road bridges were built over the cutting at Thompson and Cole Streets. Until 1987, the line continued around the bend to the now closed and demolished Williamstown Pier.

The central section of the station building remains today, but was originally flanked by two pavilions: one for the stationmasters residence, and the other pavilion was refreshment rooms. A now removed timber and iron veranda lined the street side of the station, while on the rail side, the original platform canopy extended along the platform much further.

The Ann Street footbridge was installed c1883, and on electrification in 1916, the Thompson Street overpass arch was removed and replaced with girder spans, to provide increased clearance.

Railway sidings, a signal box and weighbridge were once located opposite the station, but have been since removed, with a portion of the goods yard out of use by 1965. By June 1988, the majority of the sidings were removed. By October of that year, all rails, sleepers, overhead wires and signals between Williamstown and Williamstown Pier were removed, along with a further two electrified sidings, next to the platform track. The track now currently ends just under the Ann Street footbridge, at the Down end of the station.

On 18 June 1996, Williamstown was upgraded to a Premium Station.

During the 2013/2014 financial year, it was the 13th least used station on Melbourne's metropolitan network, with 164,000 passenger movements.

Platforms and services

Williamstown has one platform. It is serviced by Metro Trains' Williamstown line services.

Platform 1:
  all stations services to Flinders Street and Frankston

Transport links

Transit Systems Victoria operates one route via Williamstown station, under contract to Public Transport Victoria:
 : Williamstown – Sunshine station

Gallery

References

External links
 
 Melway map at street-directory.com.au

Heritage-listed buildings in Melbourne
Premium Melbourne railway stations
Railway stations in Melbourne
Railway stations in Australia opened in 1859
Listed railway stations in Australia
Railway stations in the City of Hobsons Bay
Williamstown, Victoria